Star of My Night is a 1954 British romance film directed by Paul Dickson and starring Griffith Jones, Kathleen Byron and Hugh Williams. An adaptation of Paul Tabori's novel Le Soleil de ma Nuit, it concerns a sculptor who becomes romantically involved with a ballerina.

Premise
A jaded sculptor becomes romantically involved with a ballerina who gives him a fresh outlook on life.

Cast
 Griffith Jones as Michael Donovan 
 Kathleen Byron as Eve Malone 
 Hugh Williams as Arnold Whitman 
 Pauline Olsen as Iris 
 Harold Lang as Carl 
 Ilona Ference as Daisy 
 André Mikhelson as Papa Condor 
 Kenneth Edwards as Doctor Dawson

References

External links

1954 films
British romance films
1950s romance films
British black-and-white films
1950s English-language films
1950s British films
English-language romance films